Tymon is a surname and male given name. Notable people with this name include:

Surname
 Angelle Tymon (born 1983), American broadcast journalist and game show host
 Josh Tymon (born 1999), English football player

Given name
 Tymon Dogg, English musician
 Tymon Mabaleka (1949–2014), Zimbabwean football player and music producer
 Tymon Tytus Chmielecki (born 1965), Polish Catholic prelate
 Tymon Zaborowski (1799–1828), Polish poet
 Tymon de Weger (1955 in Delft), Dutch politician

Other
 Tymon Park, Dublin, Ireland

See also
 Timon, name